Richard Seymour (born 29 October 1946) is a South African cricketer. He played in ten first-class matches between 1975/76 and 1978/79.

See also
 List of Eastern Province representative cricketers

References

External links
 

1946 births
Living people
South African cricketers
Eastern Province cricketers
Western Province cricketers
Cricketers from Cape Town